Robert Ross may refer to:

Academia
 Robert Ross (entrepreneur) (1918–2011), founder of Ross University
 Robert J. S. Ross (born 1943), American professor of sociology and activist
 Robert S. Ross (born 1954), American professor of political science at Boston College

Military
 Robert Ross (British Army officer) (1766–1814), Anglo-Irish British Army officer
 Robert Ross (British Marines officer) (died 1794), commander in the first European settlement of New South Wales
 Robert Knox Ross (1893–1951), British Army officer

Nobility
 Robert Ross, 5th Lord Ross (1563–1595), Scottish nobleman
 Robert Ross, 9th Lord Ross (died 1648), Scottish nobleman

Politics
 Robert Dalrymple Ross (1827–1887), South Australian politician
 Robert Beatson Ross (1867–1949), New Zealand politician
 Robert Tripp Ross (1903–1981), United States Representative from New York
 Robert Max Ross (1933–2009), Republican activist and candidate in Louisiana
 Robert Ross (Missouri politician) (born 1981), member of the Missouri House of Representatives

Sports
 Ranger Ross (Robert Lee Ross, Jr.; born 1959), American professional wrestler
 Robbie Ross (rugby league) (born 1975), Australian rugby league footballer
 Robbie Ross Jr. (born 1989), American baseball pitcher

Other
 Robert Ross (preacher), Presbyterian preacher
 Robbie Ross (1869–1918), Canadian journalist, art critic, literary executor of Oscar Wilde
 Robert Samuel Ross (1873–1931), Australian socialist journalist, trade unionist, and agitator 
 Robert Ross (botanist) (1912–2005), British botanist
 Robert Ross (CEO) (1920–2006), founder and leader of the Muscular Dystrophy Association
 Robert Ross (courtier) (born 1950), Scottish surveyor and courtier
 Black Rob (Robert Ross; 1968–2021), American rapper
 Robert J. Ross (born 1974), foundation president
 Robert Ross (blues singer), American blues vocalist, guitarist

See also
 Bob Ross (disambiguation)
 Bobby Ross (disambiguation)
 Ross (name)